Quemener, Quéméner, Quéméneur, Quémeneur or Kemener is a surname, and may refer to;

 Roger Quemener (1941–2021), French racewalker
 Ronan Quemener (born 1988), French ice hockey goaltender
 Nicolas Quemener (born 1964), French musician, member of Kornog and Skeduz.
 Hervé Quéméner, French writer
 Olivier Quemener (died 1994), French independent journalist assassinated in Algeria during the Algerian Civil War.
 Julien Quemener, a Paris Saint-Germain F.C. ultra shot and killed by a police officer trying to protect a Hapoel supporter whom the Kop of Boulogne group was attacking after a UEFA Cup on the 23 November 2006.
 Yann-Fañch Kemener (born 1957 as Jean-François Quémener) French traditional singer of 
 Perrig Quéméneur (born 1984), French road bicycle racer
 Pierre Quéméneur (1877–1923, French politician and entrepreneur, a victim in the Seznec Affair

References

Breton-language surnames
Surnames of Breton origin
Occupational surnames